Hendrick de Clerck (c. 1560 – 27 August 1630) was a Flemish painter active in Brussels during the late sixteenth and early seventeenth centuries. Stylistically he belongs to the late Mannerist generation of artists preceding Peter Paul Rubens and the Flemish Baroque, and his paintings are very similar to his contemporary Marten de Vos. His exact date of birth is unknown, but in 1594 he is employed as court painter to Archduke Ernest, a position he continued to hold in the service of the Archdukes Albert and Isabella following Ernest's death in 1596.

Altarpieces
Like Marten de Vos in Antwerp De Clerck was responsible for painting new altarpieces for churches in Brussels following the iconoclastic outbreaks of 1566, for which he used the clear visual language common in post-Tridentine Counter-Reformation art. Despite continuing to work through the early decades of the seventeenth-century, when the Baroque language was in full bloom, late works such as the Deposition for St. Peter's in Anderlecht (1628) are still decidedly Mannerist. His somewhat outmoded tendencies are also reflected in his frequent use of the triptych format that had been popular with late Medieval and northern Renaissance artists.

Cabinet paintings
De Clerck also specialized in small cabinet paintings depicting biblical, allegorical and mythological subjects, which were collected by Brussels' aristocratic patrons. Frequently he painted the figures, while collaborating with other artists, such as Jan Brueghel the Elder and Denijs van Alsloot, for the landscapes and other features.

References

Sources
 Willy Laureyssens, "Clerck, Hendrik [Hendrick] de," Grove Art Online. Oxford University Press, [accessed 19 November 2007].
 Hans Vlieghe (1998). Flemish Art and Architecture, 1585–1700, Pelican history of art. New Haven: Yale University Press. 
 Katharina Van Cauteren, 'Eight Unknown Designs by Hendrick de Clerck for Archduke Albert's Entry into Brussels in 1596', Simiolus, 2010, 1: 18–32.
 Katharina Van Cauteren, 'Le printemps au milieu de l'hyver. Hendrick De Clerck (1560–1630) en het aartshertogelijke zelfbeeld tussen canon en propaganda', PhD dissertation, Leuven, 2010.

External links

Flemish Mannerist painters
1630 deaths
Flemish Baroque painters
Court painters
Year of birth unknown